Dry Fork is a stream in Pike County in the U.S. state of Missouri. It is a tributary of Grassy Creek.

Dry Fork was so named because it often runs dry.

See also
List of rivers of Missouri

References

Rivers of Pike County, Missouri
Rivers of Missouri